Clifford Township is a township in Butler County, Kansas, USA.  As of the 2000 census, its population was 259.

History
Clifford Township was organized in 1876. The township was named for John A. Clifford, a pioneer settler.

Geography

Cemeteries
The township contains the following cemeteries:
 Clifford Cemetery (aka Pleasant Center Cemetery), located in Section 14 T23S R4E.
 Ebenezer Methodist Church Cemetery, located in Section 19 T23S R5E.

Further reading

References

External links
 Butler County Website
 City-Data.com
 Butler County Maps: Current, 1936

Townships in Butler County, Kansas
Townships in Kansas